Wright Brothers Day (December 17) is a United States national observation. It is codified in the US Code, and commemorates the first successful flights in a heavier-than-air, mechanically propelled airplane, the Wright Flyer, that were made by Orville and Wilbur Wright on December 17, 1903, near Kitty Hawk, North Carolina. On September 24, 1959, U.S. President Dwight D. Eisenhower declared December 17 to be Wright Brothers Day.

Wright Brothers Day was announced as an official commemorative day in Ohio, on October 5, 2011, celebrating 100 years of practical flight for the Wright Brothers.

See also
National Aviation Day

References

 

December observances
Observances in the United States by presidential proclamation
Wright brothers
Aviation in the United States